The 1991–92 NCAA Division I men's ice hockey season began in October 1991 and concluded with the 1992 NCAA Division I men's ice hockey tournament's championship game on April 4, 1992, at the Knickerbocker Arena in Albany, New York. This was the 45th season in which an NCAA ice hockey championship was held and is the 98th year overall where an NCAA school fielded a team.

Massachusetts–Lowell was placed on probation for 2 years and was banned from the NCAA tournament for this year due to NCAA rules violations.

Terry Slater, the head coach of Colgate, died on December 6, four days after suffering a stroke.

Regular season

Season tournaments

Standings

1992 NCAA tournament

Note: * denotes overtime period(s)

Player stats

Scoring leaders
The following players led the league in points at the conclusion of the season.

  
GP = Games played; G = Goals; A = Assists; Pts = Points; PIM = Penalty minutes

Leading goaltenders
The following goaltenders led the league in goals against average at the end of the regular season while playing at least 33% of their team's total minutes.

GP = Games played; Min = Minutes played; W = Wins; L = Losses; OT = Overtime/shootout losses; GA = Goals against; SO = Shutouts; SV% = Save percentage; GAA = Goals against average

Awards

NCAA

CCHA

ECAC

Hockey East

WCHA

See also
 1991–92 NCAA Division III men's ice hockey season

References

External links
College Hockey Historical Archives
1991–92 NCAA Standings

 
NCAA